Noureddine Bikr  (11 February 1952 – 2 September 2022) was a Moroccan actor and comedian.

Biography 

Bikr was born on 11 February 1952 in the Derb Sultan neighborhood in Casablanca. He joined the Al Oukhouwa Al Arabiya troupe in 1967 when he was 14 years old, which was led by Abdeladim Chennaoui. His beginnings were with the Tayeb Saddiki school, where Tayeb taught.  He made his debut as a comedian with the company Masrah al hay in the 1990s. The play Charrah Mallah was one of his best theatrical productions. He also took part in many soap operas and sitcoms, including Serb al Hamam with actor-director Rachid El Ouali in 1998. Bikr was known for several works shared between cinema, theater, and television, including the film Zeft (Asphalt) (1984) directed by Tayeb Saddiki, La Garde du corps (1984) by François Leterrier, and Les griffes du passé (2015)  by Abdelkrim Derkaoui. 

In 2020 many newsagents claimed that Bikr died after suffering from throat cancer since 2019, but the claims were unfounded. Before his death, he last worked in the 2021 sitcom Zawajtoka Nafis in a role with no dialogue. Bikr died on 2 September 2022.

Plays

Films

References

External links 

 Noureddine Bikr at IMDB

1952 births
2022 deaths
Moroccan comedians
21st-century Moroccan male actors
Moroccan male film actors
Moroccan male television actors
20th-century Moroccan male actors
People from Casablanca